Vladimir Sarnavsky (19 May 1875 – 1938) was a Russian Empire fencer. He competed in three events at the 1912 Summer Olympics.

References

External links
 

1875 births
1938 deaths
Male fencers from the Russian Empire
Olympic competitors for the Russian Empire
Fencers at the 1912 Summer Olympics